Kolyai may refer to:
 Kolyai dialect, see Southern Kurdish
 Kolyai, Kermanshah
 Kolyai District, in Kermanshah Province
 Kolyai Rural District, in Hamadan Province